Great Canadian may refer to:

Great Canadian Beer Festival
Great Canadian Food Show
Great Canadian Gaming
Great Canadian Shoreline Cleanup
Great Canadian Theatre Company
Great Canadian Wrestling